Barry Frederick Howard (9 July 1937 – 28 April 2016) was an English actor.  He was best known for his role as Barry Stuart-Hargreaves in the first seven series of the long-running BBC sitcom Hi-de-Hi!, in which his deadpan comedy style and classic facial expressions made him a popular character.

Life and career
Howard was born in Nottingham. While completing his national service in the Royal Navy, Howard found himself wanting to train for the theatre at the Birmingham Theatre School. Unable to gain a grant from the local authority, he worked for almost two years at the Alexandra Theatre in a backstage role to fund his place at drama school.

Howard appeared in Terry and June, You Rang, M'Lord?, The House of Windsor and Dad, in addition to Hi-de-Hi! In 2004, Howard played the character of Geoffrey in the short film Open Casket.  In November 2009, he appeared in an episode of the BBC comedy Beautiful People. Howard appeared in Doctor Who, in its 2009 two-part Christmas special, as driver of the mini-bus containing the old age pensioners' group seeking the Doctor.

In 2012, Howard appeared in the fifth series of the BBC Radio 4 comedy Fags, Mags and Bags  as Frank Butcher. In 2015, he provided the voice of the lead character in ITV's sitcom Mr Snufflesworth, a live action comedy starring a dachshund dog who lives in South London.

Howard was also a stage actor, and was half of one of the most celebrated Ugly Sister acts in pantomime regularly appearing opposite John Inman.

Death
Howard died from blood cancer, aged 78, on 28 April 2016, at his home in Poole, Dorset.

Television roles
Ghost Squad as Bartender
You Must Be Joking! as car salesman 
His Favourite family  
ITV Play as Ugly Sister 
Terry and June as Cochran's
Hi-de-Hi! as Barry Stuart-Hargreaves
You Rang, M'Lord? as Count Zarkhov 
The House of Windsor as Danny Jackson
Dad as Mr Nigel
Open Casket as Geoffrey
Beautiful People as Monsieur Antoine
Doctor Who  as Oliver Barnes

References

External links

 Obituary - BBC

1937 births
2016 deaths
Actors from Nottingham
English male stage actors
English male television actors
Male actors from Nottinghamshire
Deaths from cancer in England
Deaths from blood cancer
Royal Navy sailors
20th-century Royal Navy personnel
Military personnel from Nottingham